Igor Vladimirovich Lazarev (born 18 October 1963) is a Russian football manager and a former player.

Lazarev played in the Russian First Division with FC Torpedo Miass and FC Zenit Chelyabinsk.

External links
 

1963 births
Living people
Soviet footballers
Russian footballers
Association football defenders
FC Torpedo Miass players
Russian football managers
FC Nosta Novotroitsk players